, provisional designation , is a trans-Neptunian object and member of the classical Kuiper belt, approximately  in diameter. It was discovered on 1 November 2010, by the Pan-STARRS 1 survey at Haleakala Observatory, Hawaii, United States. It has a rotation period of 7.6 hours. It was numbered in September 2018 and remains unnamed.

Orbit and classification 

Located beyond the orbit of Neptune,  is a non-resonant classical Kuiper belt object (cubewano) of the so-called hot population, which have higher inclinations than those of the cold population. It orbits the Sun at a distance of 38.0–48.1 AU once every 282 years and 2 months (103,060 days; semi-major axis of 43.02 AU). Its orbit has an eccentricity of 0.12 and an inclination of 29° with respect to the ecliptic. The body's observation arc begins with its official discovery observation at Haleakala in November 2010.  has been identified as a member of the Haumea family in a dynamical study led by Proudfoot and Ragozzine in 2019.

Numbering and naming 

This minor planet was numbered by the Minor Planet Center on 25 September 2018. As of 2018, it has not been named.

Physical characteristics 

 is an assumed carbonaceous body with a relatively low albedo (see below).

Rotation period 

Lightcurve analysis gave a rotation period of  hours with a brightness amplitude of 0.30 magnitude.

Diameter and albedo 

According to Michael Brown and the Collaborative Asteroid Lightcurve Link,  measures 501 and 505 kilometers in diameter, based on an absolute magnitude of 4.6 and 5.0, assuming an albedo of 0.07 and 0.10 for the body's surface, respectively. The Johnston's archive estimates a smaller diameter of 443 kilometers.

References

External links 
 MPEC 2011-U10 : 2010 VK201, Minor Planet Electronic Circular – Minor Planet Center
 List of Transneptunian Objects, Minor Planet Center
 "Light curves of 32 large trans-Neptunian objects"
 Discovery Circumstances: Numbered Minor Planets (520001)-(525000) – Minor Planet Center
 
 

 

523645
523645
523645
523645
523645
20101101